Parinariopsis is a monotypic genus of flowering plants belonging to the family Chrysobalanaceae. The only species is Parinariopsis licaniiflora.

The species is found in Southern Tropical America.

References

Chrysobalanaceae
Chrysobalanaceae genera
Monotypic Malpighiales genera